Peter Chanel Peryer  (2 November 1941 – 18 November 2018) was a New Zealand photographer. In 2000, he was one of the five inaugural laureates of the Arts Foundation of New Zealand.

Career
Born in Otahuhu, Auckland, on 2 November 1941, Peryer completed a Master of Arts in Education at the University of Auckland in 1972, and lectured in English at Auckland Teachers' College. He began photographing in 1973, and was largely self-taught. His work was included in The Active Eye, the first survey of contemporary New Zealand photography, mounted by the Manawatu Art Gallery in 1975. Peryer held his first solo exhibition at the Dowse Art Museum in 1977; this was the first solo exhibition of a contemporary photographer at a New Zealand public art gallery. His work has been extensively exhibited in public and private art galleries throughout New Zealand and internationally, in solo exhibition and group shows.

In 1995 an exhibition of Peryer's work titled Second Nature: Peter Peryer Photographs toured New Zealand and Germany. One of the works used to advertise the exhibition in Europe was Dead Steer (1987), which depicts the bloated carcass of a cow on a rural roadside. New Zealand's then Minister of Agriculture John Falloon protested the inclusion and use of the work, on the basis that it was bad publicity for the New Zealand meat industry. He attempted unsuccessfully to have the exhibition closed and ordered the New Zealand High Commissioner to withdraw from attending an opening of the exhibition.

In the 1997 Queen's Birthday Honours, Peryer was appointed an Officer of the New Zealand Order of Merit, for services to photography. In 2000, he was among the five artists recognised by the Arts Foundation of New Zealand as their inaugural Laureates.

Peryer died in New Plymouth on 18 November 2018 at the age of 77.

Work
Peyer began taking photographs with a cheap Diana camera. Early series and portfolios included Mars Hotel (1975), Gone Home (1975) and Souvenir (1976.) In a review of Peryer's early activity in late 1977 critic Neil Rowe wrote "Although he has been taking photographs seriously for only two years he has achieved a highly distinctive style and an intensely personal repertoire of imagery".

In 1979 Peryer was included in the Auckland Art Gallery exhibition Three New Zealand photographers: Fiona Clark, Laurence Aberhart, Peter Peryer, which toured to nine other galleries. Peryer showed 11 works, including a number of photographs of various zoo animals, including pelican, ibis, peacock, alligator, monitor lizard, kingfisher.  Each animal was captured in such a way that its surrounding enclosure was not removed but suggested in the image, an ongoing theme of Peryer's work.

Peryer's best-known early works are a series of photographs taken of his then-wife, Erika Parkinson. The portraits were gathered into a 2000–01 touring exhibition Erika: A Portrait by Peter Peryer.  The exhibition curator Justin Paton wrote at the time:

Nothing in New Zealand photography of the seventies has the same psychological charge or stark glamour. Two decades later they still feel urgent, as if the need to look ignited the need to be looked at, and the photos just flared into being.

In a 1989 article looking back over the first 15 years of Peryer's photography career, curator Ann Elias wrote:

The group of powerful human portraits that established Peryer's reputation in the second half of the nineteen-seventies were often melodramas in which he romanticised the subject (himself, Erika, Christine Mathieson and others) through devices many artists have used in the same deliberate way – a dark and grainy technique to intensify the mystery; the choice of a haunted, confrontational or tragic expression to intensify the seriousness; and the incorporation of objects, sometimes extraneous (a rooster, a fish), often clothing, to intensify the narrative.

... A comparison of his early photographs with the most recent shows how Peryer has altered his position on the making of images. Six Foot Lake, Campbell Island can only be described as understated compared with the orchestrated drama of the early portraits.

Writing in the mid 1990s, curator Robert Leonard observed "Peter Peryer made his name as an expressive photographer producing angst-ridden portraits. A change of heart in the early 1980s saw him adopt a more formalist approach, treating miscellaneous subjects in a more documentary but still quirky way." In a 1985 exhibition catalogue Peryer said:

I work in an additive way. I tend to start with a blank picture and add the elements one by one. That's one of the reasons why so few of my pictures have horizons because it is quite hard to control the background … a painter can subtract or alter – I just build up.

Photography critic Peter Ireland traced the "growing formalism" of Peryer's works to the Grid Series of 1981. He noted that "While Peryer draws on movements and artists as distinct as Constructivism, German avant-garde photography, and Moholy-Nagy, his intellect saves this from being merely an art-historical tour to mould it into a highly-personal visual ideology". Robert Leonard also noted Moholy-Nagy and the "New Photography" movement of Weimar Germany when citing Peryer's influences and sources, but also noted "various non-art vernaculars, like botanical and catalogue photography, National Geographic, and scenic postcards." Peryer himself identified Edward Weston as a photographer he looked to, "but I was influenced not by the images so much as by the fact that he quit everything to pursue a life as a photographer. And what's more he wrote most eloquently about it."

Solo exhibitions
 2014 Peter Peryer: A Careful Eye, The Dowse Art Museum and Sarjeant Art Gallery
 2012 Other: photographic portraits 1975–2011, Gus Fisher Gallery, Auckland
 2001–2002 Erika: A Portrait by Peter Peryer, Dunedin Public Art Gallery City Gallery Wellington and Auckland Art Gallery
 2001 The left hand raised, Govett-Brewster Art Gallery
 1997 At home and away: recent photographs, Sarjeant Art Gallery
 1995–1996 Second Nature, touring New Zealand and Germany
 1986 Peter Peryer: Photographs, Sarjeant Art Gallery and touring
 1977 Peter Peryer: An Introduction, The Dowse Art Museum

Publications
 Peter Peryer: A Careful Eye, Lower Hutt: The Dowse Art Museum, 2014. 
 Peter Simpson, Peter Peryer : photographer, Auckland: Auckland University Press, 2008. 
 Silver / Peter Peryer, photographs : Bill Manhire, poem, Whanganui: McNamara Gallery, 2006. 
 Greg Burke, The left hand raised : photographs, 1995–2001, New Plymouth: Govett-Brewster Art Gallery, 2001. 
 Justin Paton, Erika : a portrait / by Peter Peryer, Dunedin: Dunedin Public Art Gallery, 2001. 
 David Maskill, After Rembrandt by Peter Peryer, Wellington: Adam Art Gallery, 1999. 
 Charles Eldredge, At home and away : recent photographs, Whanganui: Sarjeant Art Gallery, 1997.
 Greg Burke, Second nature : Peter Peryer, Zurich: Edition Stemmle, 1995. 
 Peter Peryer: Photographs, Whanganui: The Sarjeant Art Gallery, 1985.

Documentaries
A television documentary on Peryer, Peter Peryer: Portrait of a Photographer, was produced in 1994, directed by Greg Stitt.

Director Shirley Horrocks is currently working on a documentary about Peryer.

Collections
Peryer's work is held in public collections throughout New Zealand and Australia.
 Art Gallery of New South Wales
 Auckland Art Gallery
 Christchurch Art Gallery
 Museum of New Zealand Te Papa Tongarewa
  National Gallery of Victoria
 Sarjeant Gallery

Further reading
 'Peter Peryer (1941 - 2018), various contributors, Art New Zealand, Number 169, Autumn 2019
Peter Peryer (1941 - 2018), Artforum, 20 November 2018

References

External links
 Courtney Johnston, Remembering the artist Peter Peryer, Nine to Noon, RNZ National, 21 November 2018
 Andrew Clark, Peter Peryer: The Searcher, Bowerbank Ninow, May 2018 
 Interview with Peter Peryer, Standing Room Only, RNZ National, 27 May 2018
 Interview with Peter Peryer, Standing Room Only, RNZ National, 25 August 2014
 Megan Dunn, A Careful Eye: Peter Peryer, NZ Listener, 23 August 2014
 Jim Barr and Mary Barr interview with Peter Peryer, Museum of New Zealand Te Papa Tongarewa, May 2014
 Linda Herrick, Exhibition pays homage to Peter Peryer, New Zealand Herald, 2001

1941 births
2018 deaths
New Zealand artists
New Zealand photographers
Officers of the New Zealand Order of Merit
People from Auckland
University of Auckland alumni
Photographers from Auckland